2025 World Gamesis the 12th edition of the World Games, which includes sports and sporting disciplines that are not contested in the Olympic Games. It is expected to be held in Chengdu, China. This is the first edition to be held under the guidelines set by the strategy paper "Growth Beyond Excellence", the second edition to be held in Asia, and the first time for the nation to host the World Games.

Bidding
Luo Qiang, Mayor of Chengdu, signed the Organiser Agreement for TWG 2025, with the Vice President of IOC and the Chinese Olympic Committee as witness. President José Perurena signed on behalf of the International World Games Association.

Participants
Under the ‘Growth Beyond Excellence’ guidelines ,the maximum permitted number (including athletes and technical officials) for the sports program of TWG 2025 and onwards will be increased from 4200 to 5000. 4000 participants are proposed by the IWGA Member Federations; while the remaining 1000 participants consists of disciplines in consultation with organizing committee, disciplines in determination with IOC's consultation and para disciplines which will be determined through consultation with the IPC.

References

World Games
International sports competitions hosted by China
2025
Multi-sport events in China